Datuan is a town in Pudong New District, Shanghai, China. , it administers the following five neighborhoods and 16 villages:
Neighborhoods
Nanda
Beida
Sandun
Dongda Community
Dongnan

Villages
Zhennan Village
Chezhan Village
Guoyuan Village
Jinshi Village
Zhaoqiao Village
Haichao Village
Shaozhai Village
Tuanxi Village
Jinyuan Village
Jinqiao Village
Yuanyi Village
Longshu Village
Zhoubu Village
Fulan Village
Tuanxin Village
Shao Village

References

Towns in Shanghai
Pudong